Betschart is a surname. Notable people with the surname include:

Hermann Betschart (1910–1950), Swiss rower
Kurt Betschart (born 1968), Swiss professional cyclist
Nina Betschart (born 1995), Swiss professional beach volleyball player
Sandra Betschart (born 1989), Swiss footballer